Linus Heidegger  (born 23 August 1995) is an Austrian speed skater who competes internationally.
 
He participated at the 2018 Winter Olympics.

References

External links

1995 births
Living people
Austrian male speed skaters 
Olympic speed skaters of Austria 
Speed skaters at the 2018 Winter Olympics 
Universiade bronze medalists for Austria
Universiade medalists in speed skating
Competitors at the 2017 Winter Universiade
21st-century Austrian people